Léonard Mascaux (19 January 1900 – 25 June 1965) was a French long-distance runner. He competed in the men's 5000 metres at the 1924 Summer Olympics.

References

External links
 

1900 births
1965 deaths
Athletes (track and field) at the 1924 Summer Olympics
French male long-distance runners
Olympic athletes of France
Place of birth missing